Panama competed at the 1972 Summer Olympics in Munich, West Germany.

Results by event

Athletics
Men's 800 metres
Donaldo Arza
 Heat — 1:51.2 (→ did not advance)

Men's 1500 metres
Donaldo Arza
 Heat — 3:41.7 (→ did not advance)

Boxing
Men's Bantamweight (– 54 kg)
 Luis Ávila
 First Round — Lost to Juan Francisco Rodríguez (ESP), 0:5

Men's Lightweight (– 60 kg)
 Roy Hurdley
 First Round — Lost to Ivan Mikhaylov (BUL), referee stopped contest

Weightlifting
Men's Lightweight
Ildefonso Lee

Men's Heavyweight
Henry Phillips

Wrestling
Men's Freestyle Flyweight 
Wanelge Castillo

Men's Freestyle Lightweight
Segundo Olmedo

References
sports-reference
Official Olympic Reports

Nations at the 1972 Summer Olympics
1972 Summer Olympics
1972 in Panamanian sport